Minuscule 638 (in the Gregory-Aland numbering), α 188 (von Soden), is a Greek minuscule manuscript of the New Testament, on parchment. Palaeographically to the 11th century. The manuscript is lacunose. Scrivener labelled it by 191a and 245p.

Description 

The codex contains the text of the Acts of the Apostles, Catholic epistles, Pauline epistles, on 306 parchment leaves (size ), with lacuna (Acts 1:1-11). It is written in one columns per page, 23 lines per page.

It contains a catena added by a later hand and dated to the 1312.

The order of books: Acts of the Apostles, Catholic epistles, and Pauline epistles. Epistle to the Hebrews is placed after Epistle to Philemon.

Text 

The Greek text of the codex is a representative of the Byzantine text-type. Kurt Aland placed it in Category V.

History 

The manuscript is dated by INTF to the 11th century. Formerly it was housed in Mar Saba. In 1731 it was brought from Constantinople to England.

The manuscript was examined by Walker. It was added to the list of the New Testament manuscripts by Scrivener. Gregory saw the manuscript in 1886.

Formerly it was labelled it by 191a and 245p. In 1908 Gregory gave the number 638 to it.

The manuscript currently is housed at the library of Christ Church College (Wake 38), at Oxford.

See also 

 List of New Testament minuscules
 Biblical manuscript
 Textual criticism
 Minuscule 639

References 

Greek New Testament minuscules
11th-century biblical manuscripts